Diseases of Vaccinium species, including blueberry, cranberry, bilberry, etc:

Oomycetes
 Phytophthora cinnamomi

Fungi

Bacteria
 Ralstonia solanacearum
 Xylella fastidiosa, including
 X. f. subsp. fastidiosa
 X. f. subsp. multiplex

Viruses
 and various viruses

References

 
Vaccinium